Amiga Power (AP) was a monthly magazine about Amiga video games. It was published in the United Kingdom by Future plc, and ran for 65 issues, from May 1991 to September 1996.

Philosophy
Amiga Power had several principles which comprised its philosophy regarding games. Like almost all Amiga magazines of the time, they marked games according to a percentage scale. However, Amiga Power firmly believed that the full range of this scale should be used when reviewing games. A game of average quality rated on this scale would therefore be awarded 50%. Stuart Campbell offered some rationale for this in his review of Kick Off '96 in the final issue of the magazine:

Amiga magazines at the time tended to give "average" games marks of around 70%, and rarely gave scores below 50%. Because the public was not used to this method of grading, AP gained a reputation among publishers for being harsh and unfair. AP occasionally hinted that game reviewers were being given incentives by game PR divisions to mark games highly.

Amiga Power irregular features

APATTOH
APATTOH, meaning Amiga Power All Time Top One Hundred, was a yearly feature. It originally started in AP issue No. 0 (a special "preview issue" of Amiga Power given away as an addition to an issue of Amiga Format), and later appeared approximately in every issue whose number was divisible by 12, plus 1.

APATTOH ranked games depending on how the staff liked them. This meant that games that got good press at the time when they came out could end up very low (or entirely absent) on the list. A notable example is Frontier, which most other magazines of the time reviewed positively, but Amiga Power ranked #100 in their top 100 list (emphasizing the point by placing it one place below a public-domain version of Pong).

There were two games that held an iron grip on the #1 spot in the list. The first was Rainbow Islands: The Story of Bubble Bobble 2, a coin-op conversion platform game that the magazine controversially deemed the Amiga's finest game for the first two years of its existence. The second was Sensible Soccer, which took over the top position in the first AP Top 100 after its release (the game came out too late for the 1992 chart), and never relinquished it (except to its own sequel Sensible World Of Soccer) for the rest of the magazine's existence.

F-Max
In its later years, Amiga Power started advertising a fictional refreshment beverage called F-Max, the lightly sparkling fish drink, with the slogan an ocean of refreshment.

Amiga Power: The Album With Attitude

In early 2019, an Amiga Power fan launched a Kickstarter campaign to create an officially-licensed AP tribute album containing remixes of assorted Amiga game tunes, accompanied by a booklet featuring contributions from former members of the magazine's team. The campaign was successful, and in July 2020 the finished album was officially released.

Most of the remixes were created by the original composers; among those who contributed to the album were Alistair Bowness, Allister Brimble, Fabio Cicciarello, Mike Clarke, Adam Fothergill, Olof Gustafsson, Jon Hare, Chris Huelsbeck, Carl Jermy, Barry Leitch, Jogeir Liljedahl, Alex May, Anthony Milas, Jason Page, Matthias Steinwachs, and Tim Wright.

The physical album took the form of a small hardback book, with two CDs attached to the inside of the front and back covers, and the 100-page Mighty Booklet sandwiched between them. The first CD – subtitled AP's Pick Of The Pops – featured remixes of music personally selected by AP team members (including former editors Matt Bielby, Mark Ramshaw, Linda Barker, Stuart Campbell, Jonathan Davies, Cam Winstanley, Tim Norris and Steve Faragher, plus others), while the second CD – subtitled The AP Bonus Coverdisk – featured remixes inspired by games and demos that appeared on the magazine's cover-mounted disks over the years. The Mighty Booklet contained detailed information about each of the tracks featured on the album, including interviews with the musicians, behind-the-scenes facts, anecdotes and asides from the AP team and full song lyrics; a special The Last Resort section written by Rich Pelley; adverts for F-Max and a Canoe Squad movie; a feature entitled The 'Bum Line, based on The Bottom Line, listing other albums of interest; and an ongoing storyline (following on from the events of AP65) in which the AP team are restored to life by The Four Cyclists Of The Apocalypse so they can attend a concert in their honor.

As of August 2020, the album remains available to buy via the original Kickstarter homepage and is also on the websites of C64Audio.com and 010101 Music.

See also
Amiga Force
Amiga Survivor
Digitiser

References

External links
AP2 - An Amiga Power information site created by AP writers Jonathan Nash and Stuart Campbell, with a wealth of behind-the-scenes stories about the magazine.
World Of Stuart - Stuart Campbell's extensive website, which includes an archive of Amiga Power and other articles.
House of Nash - Jonathan Nash's website, which included a selection of Amiga Power and other articles, now taken down, but which may put back up in the future.
Digiworld - Short-lived attempt at reviving Digitiser on the Internet, with Stuart, Jonathan Nash and "Mr Popular", aka Kieron Gillen.
Need to Know - The fortnightly tech update for the UK, co-written by AP Production Editor, Dave Green.
Games Press - A one-stop PR resource for the games industry run by AP's Gentlemanly Editor, Jonathan Davies.
The Weekly - Created by Jonathan Nash and Mil Millington. Now ceased, though a return is promised.
Things My Girlfriend and I Have Argued About - The website which would later give its name to Millington's first novel.
Kieron Gillen's workblog - By AP's Walking Tips Machine, C-Monster, that previously existed here
Amiga History Guide: Amiga Power - an alternative history of the magazine.
"It's a skull", a famous OctaMED music file sent to the magazine by a reader
 Interview with Amiga Power staff, May 2016
 Archived Amiga Power magazines on the Internet Archive

1991 establishments in the United Kingdom
1996 disestablishments in the United Kingdom
Amiga magazines
Defunct computer magazines published in the United Kingdom
Magazines established in 1991
Magazines disestablished in 1996
Mass media in Bath, Somerset
Monthly magazines published in the United Kingdom
Video game magazines published in the United Kingdom